Corner Office is a 2022 American black comedy film directed by Joachim Back and written by Ted Kupper, based on the novel The Room by Jonas Karlsson. The film stars Jon Hamm, Danny Pudi, Sarah Gadon and Christopher Heyerdahl.

The film premiered at the Tribeca Film Festival on June 9, 2022.

Cast
 Jon Hamm as Orson
 Danny Pudi as Rakesh
 Sarah Gadon as Alyssa
 Christopher Heyerdahl as Andrew

Production
In February 2021, it was announced Jon Hamm, Danny Pudi, Sarah Gadon, and Christopher Heyerdahl joined the cast of the film, with Joachim Beck directing from a screenplay by Ted Kupper.

Principal photography began in February 2021 in Vancouver, British Columbia.

Release
The film premiered at the Tribeca Film Festival on June 9, 2022.

Reception
On review aggregator Rotten Tomatoes, 17% of 6 critic reviews, with an average rating of 4.40/10.

References

External links
 

2022 black comedy films
2020s English-language films
American black comedy films
Anonymous Content films
Films based on Swedish novels
Films set in offices
Films shot in Vancouver
Workplace comedy films
2020s American films